Placental growth factor (PlGF) is a protein that in humans is encoded by the PGF  gene.

Placental growth factor (PGF) is a member of the VEGF (vascular endothelial growth factor) sub-family - a key molecule in angiogenesis and vasculogenesis, in particular during embryogenesis.  The main source of PGF during pregnancy is the placental trophoblast.  PGF is also expressed in many other tissues, including the villous trophoblast.

The placental growth factor (PGF) gene is a protein-coding gene and a member of the vascular endothelial growth factor (VEGF) family. The PGF gene is expressed only in human umbilical vein endothelial cells (HUVE) and the placenta. PGF is ultimately associated with angiogenesis. Specifically, PGF plays a role in trophoblast growth and differentiation. Trophoblast cells, specifically extravillous trophoblast cells, are responsible for invading the uterine wall and the maternal spiral arteries. The extravillous trophoblast cells produce a blood vessel of larger diameter for the developing fetus that is independent of maternal vasoconstriction. This is essential for increased blood flow and reduced resistance. Proper development of blood vessels in the placenta is crucial for the higher blood requirement of the fetus later in pregnancy. 
Under normal physiologic conditions, PGF is also expressed at a low level in other organs including the heart, lung, thyroid, and skeletal muscle.

Isoform tissue specificity 

There are three isoforms of this protein: PGF-1, PGF-2, PGF-3. PGF-1 is specifically found in the colon as well as mammary carcinomas, while PGF-2 is only found in early placenta up until the 8th week of development. PGF-2 is the only isoform able to bind to heparin. PGF-3 is found mainly in placental tissues.

Clinical significance 

Placental growth factor-expression within human atherosclerotic lesions is associated with plaque inflammation and neovascular growth.

Serum levels of PGF and sFlt-1 (soluble fms-like tyrosine kinase-1, also known as soluble VEGF receptor-1) are altered in women with preeclampsia.  Studies show that in both early and late onset preeclampsia, maternal serum levels of sFlt-1 are higher and PGF lower in women presenting with preeclampsia.  In addition, placental sFlt-1 levels were significantly increased and PGF decreased in women with preeclampsia as compared to those with uncomplicated pregnancies.  This suggests that placental concentrations of sFlt-1 and PGF mirror the maternal serum changes.  This is consistent with the view that the placenta is the main source of sFlt-1 and PGF during pregnancy.1

PGF is a potential biomarker for preeclampsia, a condition in which blood vessels in the placenta are too narrow, resulting in high blood pressure.  As mentioned before, extravillous trophoblast cells invade maternal arteries. Improper differentiation may result in hypo-invasion of these arteries and thus failure to widen enough. Studies have found low levels of PGF in women who were diagnosed with preeclampsia later in their pregnancy.

Associated diseases 

Placental insufficiency, otherwise known as uteroplacental vascular insufficiency, results from insufficient blood supply to the placenta. This disease is characterized by an alteration in the PGF gene and its GPCR and ERK signaling pathways. Alterations in the PGF and the PGF receptor mRNA expression prevent the normal development of placental vasculature. 

Twin-to-Twin transfusion syndrome is another disease associated with the PGF gene. This is a rare disease occurring primarily in identical twins where blood from one twin is transferred to the other. Typically, the twin whose blood is being transferred is born smaller and with anemia while the other twin is born larger with too much blood and at increased risk for heart failure. The PGF gene pathways primarily affected are the TGF-Beta pathway and AKT signaling pathway.

References

Further reading 

 
 
 
 
 
 
 
 
 
 
 
 
 
 
 
 
 
 
 
 
 

Angiology
Growth factors